There have been 39 FoxTrot books published so far, all by Andrews McMeel Publishing. Of the 39 books, 27 are collections and 11 are anthologies. The anthologies are composed of the two or three previous collections, and include Sunday strips in color.

Collections
Beginning with Death by Field Trip, the size and shape of the regular collections changed to accommodate a new Sunday strip layout. The books also became shorter (and much cheaper) to create a larger gap between anthologies.

Anthologies
Originally, the anthologies were made up of the previous two smaller collections, with color Sunday strips (as opposed to black and white in the smaller books). Starting with FoxTrot: Assembled with Care, the anthologies are made up of the three previous smaller books.

Other books

FoxTrot
Andrews McMeel Publishing books